Absolut Vodka is a brand of vodka, produced near Åhus, in southern Sweden. Absolut is a part of the French group Pernod Ricard. Pernod Ricard bought Absolut for €5.63 billion in 2008 from the Swedish state. Absolut is one of the largest brands of spirits in the world (after Smirnoff, Bacardi) and is sold in 126 countries.

History

Absolut was established in 1879 by Lars Olsson Smith. Smith challenged the city of Stockholm's liquor marketing monopoly with his vodka. It was sold outside the city border at a lower price than the monopoly's product. Smith offered free boat rides to the distillery and "Rent Brännvin" was highly successful.

In 1917, the Swedish government monopolized the country's alcohol industry. Vodka was then sold nationwide under the name "Absolut Rent Brännvin". In 1979, the old name Absolut was picked up when the upper-price range Absolut Vodka was introduced. Renat is the name of another vodka product sold by Pernod Ricard Sweden AB.

Absolut Vodka was introduced to the global market in 1979. Today, Absolut sells over 100 million litres of vodka annually (2018). The vodka is made from winter wheat and is produced now only in Åhus.

Lars Olsson Smith
Lars Olsson Smith was born in 1836 in Kiaby and died in 1913 in Karlskrona, Sweden. L.O. Smith was an entrepreneur, parliamentarian and founder of Absolut Rent Brännvin (Absolutely pure spirit). It was the inspiration for Absolut Vodka. L.O. Smith launched a method that removes contaminants such as glut in the spirits. L.O. Smith came from a peasant family in Blekinge and quickly made a career in the retail trade as a 6-year-old. He later moved to Stockholm and started manufacturing and selling vodka at his factory at Reimersholme.

Advertising

In the early 1980s in New York, Absolut Vodka was popular among the creative community. Absolut's first advertising campaign was created by TBWA for the brand's U.S. Importer, Carillon Importers, Ltd.

Absolut Vodka is known for its long-running advertising campaign created by TBWA. The first of these ads, typical of the rest, was introduced in 1981 and featured a picture of the bottle with a halo over the cap above the slogan "Absolut Perfection".

Absolut's first advertising campaign ran for fifteen years from its launch in 1980. The campaign has encompassed many different kinds of ads, such as art, fashion, cities, spectaculars, Hollywood, etc. The advertising has won hundreds of awards, including charter membership in the American Marketing Association's Marketing Hall of Fame. Absolut was inducted into the Hall in 1992 along with just two other brands: Coca-Cola and Nike.

In 1983, Carillon's President/CEO Michel Roux approached the artist Andy Warhol, whom he paid $65,000 to create an advertisement for Absolut. Over the years, Carillon commissioned the work of well-known painters, graphic designers, fashion designers, as well as many up-and-coming artists.
During the 2017 Corporate Art Awards Ceremony hosted by the President of the Italian Republic Sergio Mattarella at the Quirinal Palace, Absolut received by pptArt a special award “for their long-running collaboration with 550 artists on 850 projects to shape their corporate image and brand”. The talents included such names as Damien Hirst, Rosemarie Trockel, Helmut Newton, Javier Mariscal, Maurizio Cattelan, Louise Bourgeois and many, many more.

In 2005, Absolut invited American singer Lenny Kravitz to participate in its promotional campaign. The song "Breathe" was recorded and released. The song was remixed many times by various DJs.

In 2007, Absolut introduced its new global campaign, "In An Absolut World", created by TBWA/Chiat/Day.

In 2008, an advertisement placed in Mexican publications and on Mexican billboards featured a map of the U.S. and Mexico with the boundaries between the two as they were prior to the 1836 Texas Revolution and the Mexican–American War. Media outlets reported on some American consumers' reactions at the advert's perceived insensitivity to immigration issues.
Absolut responded that the adverts were purely whimsical, with no political or nationalist agenda, but its critics were adamant. Absolut later issued a public apology and withdrew the advert.

In 2009, Absolut debuted a campaign with renowned fashion photographer Ellen Von Unwerth and actresses Kate Beckinsale and Zooey Deschanel to celebrate different Absolut drinks.

In 2010 Absolut collaborated with Spike Jonze to create a short film entitled I’m here. The short film was screened at festivals such as Sundance Film Festival and Berlin Film Festival.

In 2012, Absolut partnered with Swedish House Mafia to create an original track and music video to promote Absolut Greyhound cocktail. “Greyhound”–which is the title of the drink, the video, and the actual music track–is a video created by TBWA\Chiat\Day, where three groups of racing enthusiasts converge on the Bonneville Salt Flats to watch robotic greyhounds speed across the plains, holding pink Absolut Greyhounds in their hands.

In 2013, Absolut launched the Global 'Transform Today' Campaign by the creative agency, Sid Lee. The creative features four artists. Sid Lee recruited four international emerging artists to inspire younger generations. French artist, director and musician Woodkid, American digital media artist Aaron Koblin, fashion designer Yiqing Yin and Brazilian graphic novel artists Rafael Grampa is featured.

As part of this platform, Absolut launched the Absolut Creative Competition in 2018 which was an art competition. In May 2019 Absolut announced the global winner that was selected by global juries such as Mickalene Thomas, Aaron Cezar and Bose Krishnamachari. Sarah Saroufim from Lebanon was declared the winner from 7,500 entrants with her design.

See also
 Absolut Art Collection
 Absolut Citron
 Explorer Vodka

References

External links

1879 introductions
Pernod Ricard brands
Goods manufactured in Sweden
Swedish brands
Swedish vodkas